Chatsworth is a rural locality in the Gympie Region, Queensland, Australia. In the  Chatsworth had a population of 1,055 people.

Geography 

Fishermans Pocket State Forest occupies a large section of the south west of Chatsworth.

History
Historically, the suburb was mostly used for dairy farming, but is now predominantly used for residential land.  The area was once part of the Shire of Cooloola a former local government area.

Chatsworth Wesleyan Methodist Church opened on Sunday 16 August 1885. It was on the Chatsworth Road (now the Bruce Highway).

On Sunday 11 October 1885 St Jude's Anglican church opened at Chatsworth.

Chatsworth Provisional School opened on 18 April 1900. On 1 January 1909, it became Chatsworth State School.

Chatsworth Baptist Church opened on Saturday 17 August 1918.

In the  Chatsworth had a population of 1,055 people.

Heritage listings 
Chatsworth has the following heritage listings:

 3 Allen Road: Chatsworth Hall
 15 Rammutt Road: Chatsworth School

Education 
Chatsworth State School is a government primary (Prep-6) school for boys and girls at 15 Rammutt Road. In 2018, the school had an enrolment of 232 students with 22 teachers (17 full-time equivalent) and 14 non-teaching staff (9 full-time equivalent). It includes a special education program.

Amenities 
Expansion Church (formerly Christian Family Church) is at 38 Fritz Road. It is a member of the Australian Christian Churches.

References

External links
 

Suburbs of Gympie
Localities in Queensland